The 1981 Primera División season was the 90th season of top-flight football in Argentina. Boca Juniors won the Metropolitano (20th title) while River Plate (21st title) won the Nacional championship. League is Superliga Argentina.

Colón and San Lorenzo were relegated.

Metropolitano championship

Nacional championship

Group A

Group B

Group C

Group D

Quarterfinals

|-
|}

Semifinals

|-
|}

 River Plate advanced on away goals rule

Final

|-
|}
 River Plate won 2–0 on aggregate.

First leg

Second leg

References

Argentine Primera División seasons
Primera Division
Arg